
Gmina Zakroczym is an urban-rural gmina (administrative district) in Nowy Dwór County, Masovian Voivodeship, in east-central Poland.

Villages
Apart from the town of Zakroczym, Gmina Zakroczym contains the villages and settlements of Błogosławie, Czarna, Emolinek, Henrysin, Janowo, Mochty-Smok, Smoły, Smoszewo, Śniadowo, Strubiny, Swobodnia, Trębki Stare, Wojszczyce, Wólka Smoszewska, Wygoda Smoszewska and Zaręby.

Neighbouring gminas
Gmina Zakroczym is bordered by the town of Nowy Dwór Mazowiecki and by the gminas of Czerwińsk nad Wisłą, Czosnów, Joniec, Leoncin, Nasielsk, Pomiechówek and Załuski.

References

Polish official population figures 2006

Zakroczym
Nowy Dwór Mazowiecki County